The 1905 New York Highlanders season was a season in American baseball. It was the team's third season. The Highlanders finished in sixth place in the American League with a record of 71–78. The team was managed by Clark Griffith and played its home games at Hilltop Park.

Regular season

Season standings

Record vs. opponents

Roster

Player stats

Batting

Starters by position 
Note: Pos = Position; G = Games played; AB = At bats; H = Hits; Avg. = Batting average; HR = Home runs; RBI = Runs batted in

Other batters 
Note: G = Games played; AB = At bats; H = Hits; Avg. = Batting average; HR = Home runs; RBI = Runs batted in

Pitching

Starting pitchers 
Note: G = Games pitched; IP = Innings pitched; W = Wins; L = Losses; ERA = Earned run average; SO = Strikeouts

Other pitchers 
Note: G = Games pitched; IP = Innings pitched; W = Wins; L = Losses; ERA = Earned run average; SO = Strikeouts

Relief pitchers 
Note: G = Games pitched; W = Wins; L = Losses; SV = Saves; ERA = Earned run average; SO = Strikeouts

External links 
1905 New York Highlanders season at Baseball Reference
1905 New York Highlanders team page at www.baseball-almanac.com

New York Yankees seasons
New York Highlanders
New York Highlanders
1900s in Manhattan
Washington Heights, Manhattan